Wu Tai-Hao (born February 7, 1985, in Taoyuan County (now Taoyuan City, Taiwan) is a Taiwanese basketball player for the Tainan TSG GhostHawks of the T1 League.

Wu plays centre for the Chinese Taipei men's national basketball team, as well as for his Taiwanese club teams, but had adjusted to play forward while competing in the Pacific West Conference, a Division II league of the NCAA, as a member of the Brigham Young University–Hawaii varsity team.  As a starter, he averaged 24.6 minutes, 10.7 points, 5.3 rebounds, and 1.6 blocks per game in the 2006-2007 season.

After his brief college basketball career in the United States, Wu returned to Taiwan to play in the Super Basketball League where he won a shot-block champion title and helped the Taiwan Beer club team to its second championship in 2008.

Averaging 6.9 points and 3.7 rebounds per game, Wu helped the Chinese Taipei national team to an improved fifth-place finish at the FIBA Asia Championship 2009.

On July 22, 2022, Wu signed with the Tainan TSG GhostHawks of the T1 League.

References

1985 births
Living people
Basketball players at the 2002 Asian Games
Basketball players at the 2010 Asian Games
Basketball players at the 2014 Asian Games
BYU–Hawaii Seasiders men's basketball players
Centers (basketball)
Sportspeople from Taoyuan City
Power forwards (basketball)
Shanxi Loongs players
Taiwanese men's basketball players
Zhejiang Lions players
Taiwanese expatriate basketball people in the United States

Taiwanese expatriate basketball people in China
Asian Games competitors for Chinese Taipei
Tainan TSG GhostHawks players
T1 League players
Hsinchu JKO Lioneers players
Fubon Braves players
Taiwan Beer basketball players
Jeoutai Technology basketball players
Chinese Taipei men's national basketball team players
Pauian Archiland basketball players
Super Basketball League players
ETTV Antelopes players
P. League+ players